Montferri is a municipality in the comarca of Alt Camp, province of Tarragona, Catalonia, Spain. It is home to the sanctuary of Mare de Déu de Montserrat (Our Lady of Montserrat), a small Modernist church by Josep Maria Jujol.

See also
Vilardida

References

External links
 Government data pages 
 The Sanctuary of Montferri – One of the wonders by Josep Maria Jujol 

Municipalities in Alt Camp
Populated places in Alt Camp